The Sakar-20 is a Russian-made 122mm surface-to-surface missile.  It is approximately 2 meters in length with a range of approximately 30 kilometers and the capacity to devastate an area of about 100 square meters.  There are reports of Pakistani-supplied Sakar-20s being used by the Taliban against United States military, NATO and Afghan positions along the border with Pakistan.

See also
Qassam rocket
Katyusha

External links
Killing ourselves in Afghanistan - Salon.com
Death by the Light of the Silvery Moon

Rocket artillery